In Japanese culture, the JK business is the practice of compensated dating with adolescent girls. Typical scenario of a JK encounter: a girl gives out leaflets inviting for a JK or in English a JK walk or a walking date. Earlier the offered service was known as a "refresh business". When police began investigations into the practice of "JK"; the "sanpo business" arose. This is when a girl is paid for social activities such as walking and talking, and is also sometimes referred to as "fortune telling". Another activity is reflexology ("rifure"). Many of the girls work in Akihabara in Tokyo.

The U.S. State Department reported in 2017 that the Government of Japan "does not fully comply with the minimum standards for the elimination of trafficking", and "continues to facilitate the prostitution of Japanese children". Japan was briefly upgraded to 'Tier 1' status in the 2018 and 2019 reports, but was downgraded again to 'Tier 2' status in the 2020 and 2021 reports.

Yumeno Nito, a strong critic of government inaction on the problem, has formed a charity to assist girls in Tokyo. Cultural anthropologists have described Japan as having a shame culture, creating a barrier for teenage runaways to be reunited with their families, making them vulnerable to recruiting into the underage sex industry.

See also

 Gyaru
 Kogal

References

Prostitution in Japan